Sherlock Holmes and the Miskatonic Monstrosities is a mystery novel by James Lovegrove. It is a Sherlock Holmes pastiche that involves H. P. Lovecraft's Cthulhu Mythos. It is the second book in the Cthulhu Casebooks trilogy, with the first novel, Sherlock Holmes and the Shadwell Shadows, having been released a year previously.

Plot
15 years after the events of the Shadwell Shadows, Holmes and Watson are notified that an American is being held at Bethlem Royal Hospital and is continually writing the same three phrases in R'lyehian. A search for his identity leads to an American biologist from Miskatonic University in New England and more experiences with eldritch horrors in London.

Reception
The Guardian said "the characterisation, especially of Watson, is superb. This novel will delight fans of Doyle and Lovecraft alike" and suggests the novel "cleverly mirrors" Sir Arthur Conan Doyle's A Study in Scarlet and The Valley of Fear. Bob Byrne for Black Gate was less enthused about this novel than he was about the previous book in the trilogy saying "Fully one-third of this novel has nothing to do with Holmes or Watson" and "Watson seems particularly harsh towards Holmes in this book".

References

2017 British novels
Sherlock Holmes novels
Sherlock Holmes pastiches
Novels set in England
Crossover novels
Titan Books titles